David Andrew Welch (born 1961) is a retired United States Navy rear admiral  and surface warfare officer who last served as the 74th commander of Carrier Strike Group 15 from June 13, 2019 to June 11, 2021. He also served on the staff of the Office of the Chief of Naval Operations as Director of International Engagement from December 2017 to April 2018.

A native of Peoria, Illinois, Welch is a graduate of Limestone Community High School. He received his commission from the United States Naval Academy in 1987, where he earned a B.S. degree in English. He earned an M.A. degree in National Security Affairs from the Naval Postgraduate School in Monterey, California in 1994, and was a 2014 fellow in the Massachusetts Institute of Technology Seminar 21 program. He and his wife Mercedes have four children, two of whom (sons Benjamin and Geoffrey) are also in the Navy.

He retired from the Navy in June 2021 after 34 years of service.

Awards and decorations

References

Living people
1961 births
People from Peoria, Illinois
Military personnel from Illinois
United States Naval Academy alumni
Naval Postgraduate School alumni
Massachusetts Institute of Technology alumni
Recipients of the Defense Superior Service Medal
Recipients of the Legion of Merit
United States Navy rear admirals (lower half)